Mucin 3A is a protein that in humans is encoded by the MUC3A gene.

References

03